Luigi Arisio (25 March 1926 – 29 September 2020) was an Italian politician.

Arisio was born on 25 March 1926 in Turin. During his tenure with Fiat, Arisio founded a group for the company's administrative staff in 1974. On 14 October 1980, Arisio led a counterprotest of strike actions organized by a union of factory workers. The end of the 35-day strike was attributed to this action, which was regarded as a influential moment in Italian labor history. Arisio served a single term as a member of Chamber of Deputies from 1983 to 1987, representing the Italian Republican Party. His bid for reelection was not successful.

Arisio died on 29 September 2020, aged 94.

References

1926 births
2020 deaths
Italian trade unionists
Politicians from Turin
Italian Republican Party politicians
Deputies of Legislature IX of Italy
Fiat people